City Syd is one of the largest shopping centres in Norway, and the largest in Midt-Norge, with a turnover of NOK 1.7 billion in 2004. It is located in Tiller, in the Heimdal area of Trondheim. City Syd opened in 1987 and was remodeled and expanded in 2000. It is now 38,000 m2 and has 72 stores on three floors. It is owned by the Trondheim Cooperative, Trondos and Storebrand.

2020
In the next few years, City Syd is going to grow bigger. In 2020, it is planned to be finished and will be the biggest shopping mall in Norway.

External links
 Official website, in Norwegian

Shopping centres in Norway
Buildings and structures in Trondheim
Coop Norden
Tourist attractions in Trondheim
1987 establishments in Norway
Shopping malls established in 1987